İzzet İnce (born June 28, 1981, in Kütahya) is a Turkish  weightlifter competing in the –85 kg division.

He participated at the 2004 Summer Olympics in Athens, Greece and at the 2008 Summer Olympics in Beijing, China without achieving a podium result. In Beijing, he got injured at his right leg during his attempt to lift 190.0 kg by clean and jerk after having successfully finished the snatch session with 170.0 kg.

He won the 2004 European Weightlifting Championships held in Kyiv, Ukraine. Also he won the silver medal at the 2007 European Weightlifting Championships held in Strasbourg, France.

Medals

References

External links
International Weightlifting Federation

1981 births
People from Kütahya
Living people
Turkish male weightlifters
Olympic weightlifters of Turkey
Weightlifters at the 2004 Summer Olympics
Weightlifters at the 2008 Summer Olympics
European champions in weightlifting
European champions for Turkey
Mediterranean Games gold medalists for Turkey
Mediterranean Games medalists in weightlifting
Competitors at the 2009 Mediterranean Games
European Weightlifting Championships medalists
21st-century Turkish people